Jalan Bekok (Johor state route J150) is a major road in Johor, Malaysia. It connects Chaah in Segamat District to Paloh in Kluang District.

List of interchanges

Roads in Johor